Emilio Manuel López Fernández (born 9 July 1965), simply known as Emilio López, is a Spanish retired footballer who played as a goalkeeper, and a current coach.

Playing career
Born in Vigo, Galicia, Emilio was a Celta de Vigo youth graduate. After representing Gran Peña FC (the reserve team) and Arosa SC, he was promoted to the former's main squad in La Liga in 1989.

Emilio was subsequently third-choice during his four seasons at the club, and signed for UE Figueres in 1993 without making a single appearance. After appearing regularly he moved to Segunda División's CD Badajoz in the 1994 summer, and made his debut in the competition on 27 November 1994 by starting in a 1–0 home win against RCD Mallorca.

In 1995 Emilio joined CD Leganés, also in the second level. After being an everpresent fixture in his first and only campaign he returned to Badajoz, winning the Ricardo Zamora Trophy in 1997.

In June 1999, Emilio moved to CA Osasuna. After achieving promotion to the top division he signed with Real Jaén, also in the second division.

Emilio retired with Hércules CF in 2003, aged 37.

Post-playing career
Shortly after his retirement Emilio returned to his first club Celta, being appointed goalkeeper coach. In 2012, he joined Getafe CF B in the same role, and was promoted to the main squad in March 2014 after the arrival of Cosmin Contra.

References

External links
 Getafe official profile 
 
 Celta de Vigo biography 

1965 births
Living people
Spanish footballers
Footballers from Vigo
Association football goalkeepers
Segunda División players
Segunda División B players
Tercera División players
RC Celta de Vigo players
CD Badajoz players
CD Leganés players
CA Osasuna players
Real Jaén footballers
Hércules CF players
Shanghai Shenhua F.C. non-playing staff
Association football goalkeeping coaches
Getafe CF non-playing staff